JH Djazaïr is a defunct Algerian football club that was based in Algiers. The club was founded as CS DNC Alger and played its home games at the Stade Omar Hamadi in Bologhine. The club has existed since at least the 1972–73 season, when it reached the quarter-finals of the Algerian Cup. That is the earliest recorded mention of its existence.

JH Djazaïr won the 1981–82 edition of the Algerian Cup, beating MA Hussein Dey 2–1 in the final. They also reached the final of the 1983–84 edition but lost MP Oran in the final. They also played in the 1983 African Cup Winners' Cup where they lost in the quarter-finals to ASEC Abidjan.

Honours
 Algerian Cup
Winner (1): 1981–82
Runner-up (1): 1983–84

Performance in CAF competitions
African Cup Winners' Cup: 1 appearance
1983 – Quarter-Final

References

External links
Team profile – leballonrond.fr

Defunct football clubs in Algeria
Football clubs in Algeria
Football clubs in Algiers
1968 establishments in Algeria
1989 disestablishments in Algeria
Association football clubs established in 1968
Association football clubs disestablished in 1989